The Alexandria Glens are a Canadian junior ice hockey team based in Alexandria, Ontario, Canada. They are members of the Martin Division of the Central Canada Hockey League Tier 2 (CCHL2). They play at the Billy Gebbie Arena, also known as the Glengarry Sports Palace.  In their history, the Glens have won the D. Arnold Carson Memorial Trophy twice as district Junior "B" champions. They are 12 times St-Lawrence Division Champions and 8 times Rideau/St-Lawrence Conference Champions. The Glens are one of the most successful Team in the league since the year 2000, they went to the League Finals 6 time since 2004 and 8 times in total.

History

The Glens were formed in 1967.

In 2007, the Glens won the D. Arnold Carson Memorial Trophy as Eastern Ontario Junior "B" champions, defeating the Gatineau Mustangs 4-games-to-3 in the league final.  This marks the first time a team outside of the Metro Division of EOJBHL has won the Carson Trophy as league champions in over half a decade.  The Glens won the championship for the first that year, their Forty year of existence.

In 2008, the Glens won the D. Arnold Carson Memorial Trophy for the second time and won it back to back, defeating the Ottawa West Golden Knights 4-games-to-2 in the league final.
The Glens were the first team in Rideau/St-Lawrence Conference to win a back to back championship.

The Glens have an intense rivalry with the Char-Lan Rebels.  The rivalry has been touted as "The Battle of Glengarry" within the local community.  Games between the teams are often heated events.

On April 21, 2015, The Hawkesbury Hawks (CCHL) & Alexandria Glens (CCHL2) have become affiliates.

1971: St-Lawrence Division Champions
1974: North-East Division Champions
1984: Eastern Ontario Junior C Hockey League Champions
1988: St-Lawrence Division Champions
1988: Rideau/St-Lawrence Conference Champions
1990: St-Lawrence Division Champions
1990: Rideau/St-Lawrence Conference Champions
1991: St-Lawrence Division Champions
1998: St-Lawrence Division Champions
2002: Boxing Day Tournaments Champions
2003: St-Lawrence Division Champions
2004: St-Lawrence Division Champions
2004: Rideau/St-Lawrence Conference Champions
2005: St-Lawrence Division Champions
2005: Rideau/St-Lawrence Conference Champions
2007: St-Lawrence Division Champions
2007: Rideau/St-Lawrence Conference Champions
2007: EOJBHL Carson Trophy Champions
2007: Boxing Day Tournaments Champions
2008: Glens host 1st annual Rideau/St-Lawrence Conference Showcase
2008: St-Lawrence Division Champions
2008: Rideau/St-Lawrence Conference Champions
2008: EOJBHL Carson Trophy Champions
2009: St-Lawrence Division Champions
2009: Rideau/St-Lawrence Conference Champions
2010: St-Lawrence Division Champions
2010: Rideau/St-Lawrence Conference Champions
2015: Joins Central Canada Hockey League Tier 2 League

Season-by-season results

Playoffs
2007 Won league
Alexandria Glens defeated Kemptville 73's 4-games-to-1 in division semi-final
Alexandria Glens defeated Morrisburg Lions 4-games-to-1 in division final
Alexandria Glens defeated Westport Rideaus 4-games-to-3 in conference final
Alexandria Glens defeated Gatineau Mustangs 4-games-to-3 in final
2008 Won league
Alexandria Glens defeated Morrisburg Lions 4-games-to-0 in division semi-final
Alexandria Glens defeated Winchester Hawks 4-games-to-1 in division final
Alexandria Glens defeated Athens Aeros 4-games-to-0 in conference final
Alexandria Glens defeated Ottawa West Golden Knights 4-games-to-2 in final
2009 Lost final
Alexandria Glens defeated Winchester Hawks 4-games-to-1 in division semi-final
Alexandria Glens defeated Char-Lan Rebels 4-games-to-2 in division final
Alexandria Glens defeated Gananoque Islanders 4-games-to-0 in conference final
Ottawa West Golden Knights defeated Alexandria Glens  4-games-to-0 in final
2010 Lost final
Alexandria Glens defeated Char-Lan Rebels 4-games-to-1 in division semi-final
Alexandria Glens defeated Casselman Vikings 4-games-to-1 in division final
Alexandria Glens defeated Athens Aeros 4-games-to-2 in conference final
Ottawa Jr. Canadians defeated Alexandria Glens 4-games-to-1 in final
2011 Lost division semi-final
Winchester Hawks defeated Alexandria Glens 4-games-to-none in division semi-final
2012 Lost division semi-final
Casselman Vikings defeated Alexandria Glens 4-games-to-none in division semi-final
2013 Did Not Qualify in the Playoff
2014 Did Not Qualify in the Playoff
2015 Lost division semi-final
Winchester Hawks defeated Alexandria Glens 4-games-to-2 in division semi-final

Leagues Finals and Championships

Honoured members

Retired numbers
The Glens have retired two number in honour of two players

External links
Glens Website
Glengarry Sports Palace
EOJHL Webpage

Eastern Ontario Junior B Hockey League teams
Ice hockey clubs established in 1967
1967 establishments in Ontario